Below is a list of squads used in the 2011 African U-23 Championship.

Group A

Coach:  Azzedine Aït Djoudi
|

Coach:  Pim Verbeek
|

1

1 On the eve of the start of the competition, FIFA informed Morocco that Carcela-Gonzalez was ineligible to represent Morocco in the tournament because he had already represented Belgium in the same  competition four years ago. As it was past the deadline, a replacement couldn't be called in his place.

Coach:  Augustine Eguavoen

 

2

2Hapoel Tel Aviv midfielder Nosa Igiebor has ruled himself out of the final 2012 Olympic qualifiers in Morocco just as Nigeria team officials insist they are not aware of this development.

Coach:  Abdoulaye Sarr
|

Group B

Coach:  Alain Gouaméné
|

Coach:  Hany Ramzy
|

Coach:  Claude Albert Mbourounot

Coach:  Ephraim Mashaba
|

References

squads